Astylopsis is a genus of longhorn beetles of the subfamily Lamiinae. It was described by Casey in 1913.

Species
 Astylopsis arcuata (LeConte, 1878)
 Astylopsis collaris (Haldeman, 1847)
 Astylopsis macula (Say, 1826)
 Astylopsis perplexa (Haldeman, 1847)
 Astylopsis sexguttata (Say, 1826)

References

Acanthocinini